Subcommittee is a sculpture by Tony Cragg. Constructed of mild steel in 1991, in an edition of 4, it will rust with the passage of time.

The rack of stamps serves as a satiric commentary on committees. 

It is in the Hirshhorn Museum and Sculpture Garden.

See also
 List of public art in Washington, D.C., Ward 2

References

External links
Artnet.com: Subcommittee by Tony Cragg
Terminartors.com: Subcommittee
flickr.com: Subcommittee
flickriver.com: Subcommittee
Waymarking.com: Subcommittee

Modernist sculpture
1991 sculptures
Hirshhorn Museum and Sculpture Garden
Sculptures of the Smithsonian Institution
Abstract sculptures in Washington, D.C.
Outdoor sculptures in Washington, D.C.
Steel sculptures in Washington, D.C.
1991 establishments in Washington, D.C.